Firefox Lockwise is a deprecated password manager for the Firefox web browser, as well as the mobile operating systems iOS and Android. On desktop, Lockwise was simply part of Firefox, whereas on iOS and Android it was available as a standalone app.

If Firefox Sync was activated (with a Firefox account), then Lockwise synced passwords between Firefox installations across devices. It also featured a built-in random password generator.

The application and branding have since been "phased out."

History 

Developed by Mozilla, it was originally named Firefox Lockbox in 2018. It was renamed "Lockwise" in May 2019. It was introduced for iOS on 10 July 2018 as part of the Test Pilot program. 
On 26 March 2019, it was released for Android.

On desktop, Lockwise started out as a browser addon. Alphas were released between March and August 2019. Since Firefox version 70, Lockwise has been integrated into the browser (accessible at ), having replaced a basic password manager presented in a popup window.

End of Support 

Mozilla ended support for Firefox Lockwise on 13 December 2021. As of that day, it is no longer available on the Google Play Store or the Apple App Store to install or update.

See also 

 List of password managers

References

External links

Android (operating system) software
Firefox
Firefox extensions merged to Firefox
Free and open-source software
Free software programmed in Kotlin
Free software programmed in Swift
Free software programmed in JavaScript
IOS software
Mobile applications
Mozilla
Password managers
Software using the Mozilla license